Jesup Community School District is a public school district headquartered in Jesup, Iowa. It operates a single K-12 campus in the northern part of the city with separate divisions for elementary, middle, and high school.  it has about 1,000 students. The district occupies portions of Buchanan and Black Hawk counties.

The district has three K-8 schools outside of Jesup for Amish students. A total of 120 students, as of 2020, attend these campuses.

The school's mascot is the J-Hawk and their colors are blue and orange.

History

In 2009, the district had about 910 students, with enrollment increasing. Sarah Pinion served as superintendent until 2009; she left to become the superintendent of the Marion Independent School District. In 2009, Nathan Marting, previously superintendent of the Midland Community School District, became Jesup's superintendent.

Schools
Jesup Elementary School
Perry #1 Elementary School
Prairie Grove Elementary School
Triumph Elementary School
Jesup Middle School
Jesup High School

Jesup High School

Athletics 
The J-Hawks compete in the North Iowa Cedar League Conference in the following sports:

Cross Country (boys and girls)
 Boys' State Champions - 1990
Volleyball (girls)
Football (boys)
Basketball (boys and girls)
Wrestling (boys and girls)
Track and Field (boys and girls)
Golf (boys and girls)
Baseball (boys)
Softball (girls)
Soccer (boys and girls)
Tennis (boys and girls)

See also
List of school districts in Iowa
List of high schools in Iowa

References

External links
 Jesup Community School District

School districts in Iowa
Education in Black Hawk County, Iowa
Education in Buchanan County, Iowa